John Trevor Davies (born 26 December 1932) is a former English cricketer.  Davies was a right-handed batsman.  He was born in Shrewsbury, Shropshire, and educated at the Priory Grammar School, Shrewsbury and Cambridge University.

Davies made his first-class debut for Cambridge University against Surrey in 1957.  He made 7 further first-class appearances for the University, the last coming against Middlesex in 1958.  In his 8 first-class matches, he took 94 runs at an average of 6.26, with a highest score of 29.  His highest score came against Worcestershire in 1957.  His score was 6 more than his next highest, 23 scored against the touring West Indians in 1957.  As a fielder, Davies took 4 catches.

He also played Minor Counties Championship cricket for Shropshire from 1957 to 1958, and for Dorset from 1959 to 1964, making a combined total of 50 appearances in Minor counties cricket.

References

External links
John Davies at ESPNcricinfo
John Davies at CricketArchive

1932 births
Living people
Sportspeople from Shrewsbury
English cricketers
Cambridge University cricketers
Shropshire cricketers
Dorset cricketers